Allen Ray Aldridge Jr. (born May 30, 1972) is a former American football linebacker and long snapper of the National Football League (NFL). He was drafted by the Denver Broncos in the second round of the 1994 NFL Draft and later won Super Bowl XXXII with the team over the world champion Green Bay Packers. He played college football at Houston.

Aldridge also played for the Detroit Lions and Houston Texans.

Professional career

Denver Broncos
Aldridge was drafted by the Denver Broncos in the second round of the 1994 NFL Draft. He started at middle linebacker in Super Bowl XXXII against the Green Bay Packers. He played for them from 1994 to 1997. During the four years he started 45 of 64 games, recording 227 tackles and 1.5 sacks.

Detroit Lions
Aldridge signed with the Detroit Lions before the 1998 season. He played for the team from 1998 to 2001. In the fours years he started 59 of 64 games, recording 237 tackles, nine sacks and an interception.  He also served as the Lions' long snapper for punt coverage.

NFL statistics

References

1973 births
Living people
American football linebackers
Tyler Apaches football players
Houston Cougars football players
Denver Broncos players
Detroit Lions players